is one of ten wards of the city of Saitama, in Saitama Prefecture, Japan, and is located in the northeastern part of the city. , the ward had an estimated population of 112,862 and a population density of 2,300 persons per km².

Geography
Iwasuki Ward is within the Kantō Plain, in the northeast portion of Saitama City.

Neighboring Municipalities
Iwatsuki-ku is surrounded by Minuma-ku (west), Midori-ku (southwest), and the cities of Kawaguchi (south), Koshigaya (southeast), Kasukabe (northeast),  Shiraoka (north), and Hasuda (northwest).

History
Iwatsuki developed from the Muromachi period as a castle town next to Iwatsuki Castle and the center of Iwatsuki Domain under the Edo period Tokugawa shogunate. It was also a post town on the Nikkō Onari Kaidō connecting Edo with Nikko.

The modern town of Iwatsuki created within Minamisaitama District, Saitama with the establishment of the municipalities system on April 1, 1889. On May 3, 1954 Iwatsuki merged with the neighboring villages of Niiwa, Wado, Kawadori, Kashiwazaki, Kawai and Jionji and was elevated to city status on July 1, 1954. On April 1, 2005 Iwatsuki merged with the city of Saitama, becoming Iwatsuki Ward. Iwatsuki is known as the "City of Dolls" (人形のまち Ningyō no Machi) due to a history of doll-making that dates back to the 17th century.

Education
Mejiro University – Saitama campus
University of Human Arts and Sciences
 Iwatsuki-ku has 14 elementary schools, eight junior high schools, and four high schools, and one special education school.

Municipal junior high schools:

 Hakuyo (柏陽中学校)
 Iwatsuki (岩槻中学校)
 Jionji (慈恩寺中学校)
 Jouhoku (城北中学校)
 Jounan (城南中学校)
 Kawadoori (川通中学校)
 Nishihara (西原中学校)
 Sakurayama (桜山中学校)

Municipal elementary schools:

 Higashi Iwatsuki (東岩槻小学校)
 Iwatsuki (岩槻小学校)
 Jionji (慈恩寺小学校)
 Jouhoku (城北小学校)
 Jounan (城南小学校)
 Kamisato (上里小学校)
 Kashiwazaki (柏崎小学校)
 Kawadoori (川通小学校)
 Kawai (河合小学校)
 Niiwa (新和小学校)
 Nishihara (西原小学校)
 Ota (太田小学校)
 Tokuriki (徳力小学校)
 Wado (和土小学校)

Transportation

Railway
 Tōbu Railway – Noda Line 
 -

Highway
  – Iwatsuki Interchange

Sister cities 
  Nanaimo, British Columbia, Canada (1996)

Local attractions
Iwatsuki Castle

Noted people from Iwatsuki
Takeru Satoh, actor

References

External links

 

Wards of Saitama (city)